Kalanga may refer to:

 BaKalanga people
 Kalanga language
 Kalanga, Iran
 Kalanga, Togo

Language and nationality disambiguation pages